is one of two types of two-story gate presently used in Japan (the other one being the rōmon, see photo in the gallery below), and can be found at most Japanese Buddhist temples. This gate is distinguishable from its relative by the roof above the first floor which skirts the entire upper story, absent in a rōmon. Accordingly, it has a series of brackets (tokyō) supporting the roof's eaves both at the first and at the second story. In a rōmon, the brackets support a balcony. The tokyō are usually three-stepped (mitesaki) with tail rafters at the third step. A nijūmon is normally covered by a hip-and-gable roof.

Unlike a rōmon, whose second story is inaccessible and unusable, a nijūmon has stairs leading to the second story. Some gates have at their ends two , 2 x 1 bay structures housing the stairs. The second story of a nijūmon usually contains statues of Shakyamuni or of goddess Kannon, and of the 16 Rakan, and hosts periodical religious ceremonies. Large nijūmon''' are 5 bays wide, 2 bays deep and have three entrances, however Tokyo's Zōjō-ji, the Tokugawa clan's funerary temple, has a gate which is 5 x 3 bays. Smaller ones are 3 x 2 bays and have one, two or even three entrances.

Of all temple gate types, the nujūmon has the highest status, and is accordingly used for important gates like the chūmon (middle gate) of ancient temples as Hōryū-ji. The sanmon, the gate of a Zen temple of highest prestige, is usually a nijūmon. Some nijūmon are called  because they are situated between the entrance and the temple.

Gallery

The second story of a nijūmon
Some interior images of the second story of a nijūmon, in this case Kōmyō-ji's sanmon'' in Kamakura, Kanagawa prefecture.

See also
 Mon (architecture)

Notes

References

Bibliography
Iwanami Nihonshi Jiten (岩波日本史辞典), CD-Rom Version. Iwanami Shoten, 1999-2001 (in Japanese)

Japanese architectural features
Japanese Buddhist architecture